Thomas or Tom O'Neill may refer to:

 Thomas O'Neill (Wisconsin politician) (1821–?), member of the Wisconsin State Assembly from Milwaukee Co
 Thomas J O'Neill (1849–1919), American merchant
 Thomas O'Neill (Canadian politician) (1882–1965), Canadian politician, member of Parliamentunty
 Thomas F. O'Neill (1890–1974), American art director
Thomas O'Neill (journalist) (1904–1971), American writer for the Baltimore Sun
 Tip O'Neill (Thomas Phillip O'Neill Jr., 1912–1994), American politician
 Thomas P. O'Neill (historian) (1921–1996), Irish historian
 Tom O'Neill (ice hockey) (1923–1973), Canadian ice hockey player
 Thomas Newman O'Neill Jr. (1928–2018), United States federal judge
 Thomas P. O'Neill III (born 1945), American politician and leader of a public relations and government affairs firm
 Tommy O'Neill (born 1955), Scottish footballer

See also 
 Thomas O'Neil (disambiguation)
 Thomas O'Neal, football coach
 Tom O'Neill-Thorne (born 1997), Australian wheelchair basketballer
 Tomás O'Neill, 18th century Spanish colonial governor
 Thomas Neill (disambiguation)